The Anna Carr Homestead, located off South Dakota Highway 20 in or near Bison, South Dakota, is a historic sod house which was built in 1907.  It was listed on the National Register of Historic Places in 1978.

It is a one-story sod house that, when listed, had a wood addition to its rear, from a later date. An addition to the house served as a post office for a time.

References

Houses on the National Register of Historic Places in South Dakota
Houses completed in 1907
Perkins County, South Dakota
Sod houses